Daube is a classic Provençal (or more broadly, French) stew made with inexpensive beef braised in wine, vegetables, garlic, and herbes de Provence, and traditionally cooked in a daubière, a braising pan. A traditional daubière is a terracotta pot that resembles a pitcher, with a concave lid. Water is poured on the lid, which condenses the moisture inside, allowing for the long cooking required to tenderize lesser cuts of meat. The meat used in daube is cut from the shoulder and back of the bull,  though some suggest they should be made from three cuts of meat: the "gelatinous shin for body, short ribs for flavor, and chuck for firmness."  Although most modern recipes call for red wine, a minority call for white, as do the earliest recorded daube recipes.

Daube is adapted in New Orleans cuisine to make daube glacé.

Variations also call for olives, prunes, and flavoring with duck fat, vinegar, brandy, lavender, nutmeg, cinnamon, cloves, juniper berries, or orange peel. For best flavor, it is cooked in several stages, and cooled for a day after each stage to allow the flavors to meld together.  In the Camargue and Béarn area of France, bulls killed in bullfighting festivals are often used for daube.

Traditionally it should be cooked for a long time and prepared the night before it is served. 
Daube with lamb is traditionally made with white wine.

Daubière
A daube is traditionally made in a daubière, a potbellied earthenware pot with a small base and small opening with a canalled lid that water is poured into. The pot is filled and placed into coals or onto the stove, the lid canal is filled with water, and the contents are slowly cooked. As little liquid as possible is used, and the clay pot prevents the contents from drying. The connective tissues in the meats are gelatinized rather than dissolved. The water in the lid keeps the top of the pot at no more than boiling hot, preventing overcooking of the contents. The temperature of the top of the pot is cooler than that of the bottom, which creates a cycling of vapors and a syrupy result.

Dishes related to the daube described above are the daube gardiane from the Camargue (with bull meat), the estouffade de boeuf, also called stufatu, from Corsica (in which maccheroni are also stewed at the end of the cooking time), but also dishes called daube from other, regions further north (e.g. the daube charentaise, in the preparation of which the whole piece of meat is stewed in white wine).

What all methods of preparation have in common is that the braising liquid is hardly reduced at the end of the cooking time and is never bound with starch (flour, cornflour, etc.), which is often the case in northern braised dishes (boeuf bourguignon, carbonnade flamande, etc.). In the past it was also common to bind the braising liquid of a stave prepared with venison with freshly slaughtered hare or rabbit blood, i. H. At the end of the cooking time, stir the blood into the braising liquid with a few tablespoons of vinegar and let it boil carefully until a creamy sauce is formed.

See also

 Adobo (Equivalent Spanish and Portuguese vinegar stew)
 Pot-au-feu
 List of stews

References

External links

 
 

Cuisine of Provence
French stews
Mauritian cuisine